Prasanta Phukan (born 23 July 1954) is a Bharatiya Janata Party politician from Assam. He has been elected in Assam Legislative Assembly election in 2006, 2011, 2016 and 2021 from Dibrugarh. He is the incumbent MLA of Dibrugarh. In 2021, Prasanta Phukan won the Assam Legislative Assembly Election with a margin of 38005 votes. He was the Chairperson of the Managing Committee of Assam Medical College and Hospital, Dibrugarh, before he resigned.

References 

Living people
Bharatiya Janata Party politicians from Assam
Assam MLAs 2006–2011
Assam MLAs 2011–2016
Assam MLAs 2016–2021
People from Dibrugarh district
Assam MLAs 2021–2026
1954 births